The 1953–54 Spartan League season was the 36th in the history of Spartan League. The league consisted of 16 clubs.

League table

The division featured 16 clubs, 14 from last season and 2 new clubs: 
 Bletchley Town
 Hatfield Town

References

Spartan League seasons
9